The following article lists the presidents and heads of state of Costa Rica since Central American independence from Spain. From 1824 to 1838 Costa Rica was a state within the Federal Republic of Central America; since then it has been an independent nation.

Heads of state of Costa Rica (1824–1848)

Presidents of Costa Rica (1848–present)

Timeline

See also 
 List of presidents of the Legislative Assembly of Costa Rica
 List of presidents of the Supreme Court of Costa Rica

References

List
Costa Rica
Presidents
Presidents